Eschlikon railway station is a railway station in the municipality of Eschlikon, in the Swiss canton of Thurgau. It is an intermediate stop on the standard gauge St. Gallen–Winterthur line of Swiss Federal Railways.

Services 
The following services stop at Eschlikon:

References

External links 
 
 

Railway stations in the canton of Thurgau
Swiss Federal Railways stations